Arcadia is an unincorporated community in Indiana County, in the U.S. state of Pennsylvania.

History
Arcadia was founded around 1900 as a coal town. A post office was established in Arcadia in 1902.

References

Unincorporated communities in Indiana County, Pennsylvania
Unincorporated communities in Pennsylvania